Louis Fonteneau (died 29 January 1989) was the president of FC Nantes from 1969 to 1986.

Under his presidency, the club won 4 times the French Championship (1973, 1977, 1980, and 1983) and 1 Coupe de France (1979)

The largest stadium of Nantes, stade de la Beaujoire—Louis Fonteneau, is named after him  since 1989.

References

French football chairmen and investors
1989 deaths
Year of birth missing